KVGL (105.7 FM) is a radio station licensed to cover Manderson, Wyoming, United States. The station is currently owned by Legend Communications of Wyoming, LLC.

History
The station was assigned the call letters KGCL on July 20, 2006. On June 10, 2008, the station changed its call sign to KYTS.

The station was issued its license to cover on October 19, 2011. On November 19, 2014, it was announced that the station would be acquired by Legend Communications, sold by former owner Global News Consultants for $262,000, along with sister station KHRW 92.7 FM from Ranchester, Wyoming. The purchase was consummated on February 9, 2015.

The station changed its call sign to the current KVGL on May 15, 2018.

Previous logo

References

External links

VGL
Radio stations established in 2011
Classic hits radio stations in the United States
2011 establishments in Wyoming
Big Horn County, Wyoming